Walter Albert Coates (4 April 1895–unknown) was an English footballer who played in the Football League for Fulham, Hartlepools United, Leeds United and Newport County.

References

1895 births
English footballers
Association football forwards
English Football League players
Craghead United F.C. players
Fulham F.C. players
Leadgate Park F.C. players
Leeds United F.C. players
Newport County A.F.C. players
Linfield F.C. players
Hartlepool United F.C. players
Chester-le-Street Town F.C. players
Newport (IOW) F.C. players
Consett A.F.C. players
Year of death missing